Vasili Vasilyevich Vanin (13 January 1898, Tambov – 12 May 1951, Moscow) was a Soviet and Russian actor, theater director and pedagogue. People's Artist of the USSR (1949).

Biography
Vasili Vanin was born on 13 January 1898 in Tambov, in the family of a small railway employee. Having lost his father early, in 1906 he was assigned to an orphanage.

Filmography
 Tommy (1931)
The Return of Maxim (1937)
Lenin in October (1937)
Peat-Bog Soldiers (1938)
 Lenin in 1918 (1939)
 Member of the Government (1939)
 Valery Chkalov (1941)
Kotovsky (1942)
The District Secretary (1942)
The Front (1943)
 The Liberated Earth (1946)
Light over Russia (1947)
The Precious Seed (1948)

References

Bibliography
 Christie, Ian / Taylor, Richard. The Film Factory: Russian and Soviet Cinema in Documents 1896-1939. Routledge, 2012.

External links

1898 births
1951 deaths
20th-century Russian male actors
People from Tambov
Academic staff of the Gerasimov Institute of Cinematography
Honored Artists of the RSFSR
People's Artists of the RSFSR
People's Artists of the USSR
Stalin Prize winners
Recipients of the Order of Lenin
Recipients of the Order of the Red Banner of Labour
Russian male film actors
Russian male stage actors
Soviet male film actors
Soviet male stage actors
Soviet theatre directors
Burials at Novodevichy Cemetery